I Do, I Do is a 2012 South Korean romantic-comedy television series, starring Kim Sun-a, Lee Jang-woo, Park Gun-hyung and Im Soo-hyang. It is about a successful shoe designer in her late 30s whose career is sidetracked when she accidentally becomes pregnant.

The series aired on MBC from May 30 to July 19, 2012 on Wednesdays and Thursdays at 21:55 for 16 episodes.

Plot
Hwang Ji-ahn is in her late thirties and works as a director of a shoe company. She likes being single and has no plans to get married. Meanwhile, Tae-kang only has a high school diploma but wants a career as a shoe designer. After a one-night stand, Tae-kang gets Ji-ahn pregnant and their lives become entangled. Fighting against rigid social mores, the two of them try to navigate a messy and challenging world. But these two people persevere despite the obstacles before them, searching for true happiness despite living in a society where morally acceptable behavior is in constant flux.

Cast and characters
 Kim Sun-a as Hwang Ji-ahn
In her late thirties, she is a director at popular shoe company. To her the world is either black and white while grey areas are unacceptable. She is spunky, curt, authoritarian, hard-charging and susceptible to having hysterical fits when she is under stress. Since she was young, she had an unexplainable affection for shoes. Even when she would just throw on tracksuit pants and wear no makeup, she made sure she always wore the right shoes. Her love for shoes naturally led her to join a shoe company. Working harder and more passionately than anyone else, she was promoted to the position of director. But a one-night stand is about to throw a wrench in her immaculate and perfect life.

 Lee Jang-woo as Park Tae-kang
In his twenties, he vowed to become rich within ten years. But he only has a high school diploma, works as a seller of counterfeit luxury shoes, and constantly runs away from the police during crackdowns on illicit goods. But he believes that he has to maintain his cool style. And he invests a lot of time on networking to get a big break. By a stroke of luck, he is hired by a chaebol firm as a shoe designer. Compared to the other designers, he has no training, experience or family money. Work becomes a challenge. On top of this, he finds himself entangled with Ji-ahn who is an older woman with a bad temper...

 Park Gun-hyung as Jo Eun-sung
He is a charming gynecologist and highly eligible bachelor. Everybody in his family are doctors and he was under pressure to go to medical school. Although he is in his late thirties, he leads the lifestyle of a typical 20-year-old hipster. So hardly anyone perceives him as a married man who has settled down with a family. He wants to keep dating girls without settling down with one woman. So he has chosen to live as a bachelor. But then he meets Ji-ahn on an arranged date and becomes interested in her when she makes up a story about how she has early menopause to turn him off.

 Im Soo-hyang as Yeom Na-ri / Jang Na-ri 
Youngest daughter of the chairman of Hanyoung Apparel. She graduated with top honors from the S-Mode Institute and currently holds the title of vice president at her father's company. She has pretty looks, a stellar academic background, and a wealthy dad. In effect, she has it all. But she was the daughter of her father's mistress so she had to live in the shadows while growing up. Deep inside, she has a vulnerable heart but on the surface, she is blunt, cold, feisty and unfazed by anything. Nobody dares to anger her. With her father's support, she is on course to succeed him as his successor but she finds herself competing with her rival, Ji-ahn. So she plans on getting rid of her at the company.

 Park Yeong-gyu as Park Kwang-seok (Tae-kang's father)
 Yoon Joo-sang as Ji-ahn's father
 Shin Seung-hwan as Lee Choong-baek
 Jo Hee-bong as Seol Bong-soo
 Kim Hye-eun as Bong Joon-hee
 Oh Mi-yeon as Ji-ahn's mother
 Oh Mi-hee as Lady Jang
 Lee Dae-yeon as President Yeom
 Kim Beom-yong as Song Ha-yoon
 Baek Seung-hee as Uhm Yoo-jin
 Kim Min-hee as Ma Seong-mi
 Han Ji-wan as Yoo Da-in
 Jeon Soo-kyeong as Agency employee (cameo)

Production
Ji-ahn's extravagant walk-in shoe closet was custom-made for the drama, with the shoes inside plus those located in the character's company and office amounting to a total of 500 pairs of footwear worth .

Ji-ahn's chic fashion style has also become trend-setting, increasing the demand for the brands the character uses in the drama, as well as her bob hairstyle. According to wardrobe stylist Kim Young-joo, some of the credit belongs to actress Kim Sun-a, who gave her input during their fashion concept meetings.

At the 18th Shanghai Television Festival in June 2012, the broadcast rights of the show were sold to Japan and Taiwan.

Reception
The drama received lower-than-expected ratings with an average of 8.2 percent, according to data compiled by TNmS (Total National Multimedia Statistics); it remained at the bottom of the Wednesday and Thursday primetime ratings chart throughout the whole 16 episodes.

Ratings
In the table below,  represent the lowest ratings and  represent the highest ratings.

Soundtrack
 꽃보다 그녀 (That Girl Over Flowers) - Yesung (Super Junior)
 I DO - Park Ji-yoon 
 러닝맨 (remastered) (Running Man) - Lee Won-suk (Daybreak)
 나였으면 (If It Were Me) - Alex Chu
 처음처럼 (Like the First Time) - Kim Tae-hyeong (EDEN)
 아이두 아이두
 Victory Jian
 Lucky seven
 Ha, Hai, Yeh!
 여자, 지안
 Sweet and warm
 Love on high heels
 캥거루의 사랑
 marcato time
 A pretty girl
 No sense
 Sketch on an easel
 데칼코마니
 Gloomy day
 여자로 산다는 건
 tone on tone
 Let me know the secret take1
 Whimsy
 something sweet
 Gag duo
 A clumsy day
 Let me know the secret take2
 데칼코마니 러브

International broadcast
It aired in the Philippines on the GMA Network from May 6 to June 28, 2013, re-edited into 36 episodes.

It aired in Japan on cable channel KNTV from January 12 to March 3, 2013; it also aired on cable channel BS-Japan.

References

External links
 I Do, I Do official MBC website

Awards and nominations

2012 South Korean television series debuts
2012 South Korean television series endings
MBC TV television dramas
Korean-language television shows
South Korean romantic comedy television series
Television series by Kim Jong-hak Production